The INS Kidon (lit. Javelin) is a Sa'ar 4.5-class missile boat of the Israeli Navy, built by Israel Shipyards Ltd. and commissioned in 1997.

The ship is not the first to use this name, named after the previous Sa'ar 4-class missile boat. The newer ship comprising various systems dismantled from older Sa'ar 4 INS Kidon hull.

See also
 INS Herev
 INS Tarshish

References

External links
World Navies Today: Israel
Google Data

1997 ships
Ships built in Israel
Sa'ar 4.5-class missile boats
Naval ships of Israel
Missile boats of the Israeli Navy